Survive is the second studio album by American thrash metal band Nuclear Assault, released in 1988 on vinyl, compact disc and cassette. As of 2012, the album has been out of print. Propelled by the single "Brainwashed", Survive was the album that broke Nuclear Assault into the thrash metal mainstream, and was their first album to enter the Billboard 200, reaching number 145 on that chart. "Good Times Bad Times" was originally recorded by Led Zeppelin in 1969.

Reception

Reviews for Survive have been mostly positive. AllMusic's Eduardo Rivadavia claimed that Nuclear Assault had become "East Coast thrash metal contenders (to a throne pretty much owned by Anthrax thanks to their politically charged metal fodder." For the album's music, Rivadavia stated, "shows progress, notching up some of the band's most accomplished, lyrically controversial material to date with the title track, 'Rise from the Ashes', and the anti-mainstream media rant 'Brainwashed'." Mike Exley of Metal Forces found Survive "a finely crafted excellent album, that shows the band enlarging their sound beyond the first few tentative progressive steps the band took on The Plague". He wrote that even though "Get Another Quarter" and "PSA" are of lower standard, "the rest of the album has variety and class stamped all over it". Canadian journalist Martin Popoff praised the "pure sound" and the "vastly foucused production", describing the music "like a cross between Dan Lilker's old band Anthrax, Metallica, and the more manic of technical Bay Area speedballs."

Survive entered the Billboard 200 album charts in October 1988, four months after its release. The album peaked at number 145 and remained on the chart for ten weeks. 
In August 2014, the magazine Revolver placed Survive on its "14 Thrash Albums You Need To Own" list.

Track listing

Credits
Nuclear Assault
 John Connelly – vocals, guitar
 Anthony Bramante – lead guitar
 Danny Lilker – bass, backing vocals
 Glenn Evans – drums, percussion

Production
Randy Burns – producer
Casey McMakin – engineer
Matt Frieman – assistant engineer
Sean Rodgers – cover art
Miles Copeland – executive producer

References

External links
Nuclear Assault official website
BNR Metal band discography page

Nuclear Assault albums
1988 albums
I.R.S. Records albums